This is a list of changes made to constituencies of England and Wales by the Reform Act 1832.  Boundaries of the constituencies were defined by the Parliamentary Boundaries Act 1832.

Reduced representation

Disenfranchised and rotten boroughs 
The following 56 parliamentary boroughs, in England, were completely disenfranchised by the Act. They had all returned two members except for Higham Ferrers, which was a single member constituency. The disenfranchised boroughs lost all independent legislative representation; instead the inhabitants could vote only as part of the county electorate.

Halved representation 
The following thirty boroughs were reduced from two MPs to one. The applicable county or well-recognised part of a county in 1832 (in the case of the Ridings of Yorkshire and the Isle of Wight, which was part of Hampshire) is given. Some places were moved to other administrative counties in the 1973-74 local-government changes—e.g., Christchurch moved from Hampshire to Dorset.

Weymouth & Melcombe Regis, Dorset had jointly elected 4 MPs; this was reduced to 2.

New enfranchisements in England 
The following boroughs were enfranchised:

English boroughs given one MP (19)

English boroughs given two MPs (22)

English counties given two divisions (26) 
The following county constituencies were divided into two districts, each with two MPs:

Other changes to English counties 
The Isle of Wight, having had two of its three small boroughs disenfranchised, was given its first single MP for the whole area. It had formed part of Hampshire.

Yorkshire, which had four MPs, was given two MPs for each of the three ridings, East Riding of Yorkshire, North Riding of Yorkshire and West Riding of Yorkshire.

Berkshire, Buckinghamshire, Cambridgeshire, Dorset, Herefordshire, Hertfordshire and Oxfordshire were now to have three MPs instead of two.

Wales 

Carmarthenshire, Glamorganshire and Denbighshire increased from 1 seat each to 2.

Swansea and Merthyr Tydfil became new (one-member) Boroughs.

References

Reform Act 1932
 
1832 in the United Kingdom
1832 in politics